TMY can refer to:

 Typical Meteorological Year
 The code on Kodak T-MAX 400 negative film